"Trans Am" is a song co-written and recorded by country music duo Thompson Square. The song was released in March 2015 as the intended first single from their third studio album, though it ultimately went unreleased. Both members of the duo wrote the song with Nathan Chapman.

Critical reception
An uncredited Taste of Country review stated that "There’s no hidden message or deeper meaning to Thompson Square’s “Trans Am.” While there’s a touch of innuendo, the rocker is just a good, old-fashioned car song."

Music video
The music video was directed by Wes Edwards and premiered in June 2015.

Chart performance

References

2015 singles
Thompson Square songs
BBR Music Group singles
Songs written by Nathan Chapman (record producer)
Music videos directed by Wes Edwards
Song recordings produced by New Voice Entertainment
2015 songs